Erenora Puketapu-Hetet  (née Puketapu, 28 January 1941 – 23 July 2006) was a noted New Zealand weaver and author. A key figure in the Māori cultural renaissance, she helped change perceptions of Māori weaving/raranga from craft to internationally recognized art.

Biography
Of Te Atiawa descent, Puketapu-Hetet was born in Lower Hutt on 28 January 1941, where she died on 23 July 2006. Her parents were Vera May Puketapu (née Yeates), who was Pākehā, and Īhāia Pōrutu Puketapu.

Puketapu-Hetet grew up in the Te Atiawa tribal settlement at Waiwhetū Marae near Lower Hutt and married Rangi Hetet, one of the carvers who had worked on the marae. Rangi's grandmother, Rangimārie Hetet, herself a distinguished practitioner of raranga, taught Erenora the art of whatu kākahu korowai (cloaks).

Both Erenora and Rangi worked in the late 1970s at the New Zealand Māori Arts and Crafts Institute, which was established in Rotorua in 1963 to preserve traditional Māori cultural practices; between 1978 and 1981, as a weaving tutor there she wove the first kahu kiwi for the Institute.

In the early 80s the couple returned to the Hutt Valley, where they led the decoration of Wainuiomata Marae. Later the couple worked at Te Papa as Maori Protocol Officer/Advisor.

Puketapu-Hetet's daughters Veranoa Hetet and Kataraina Hetet are also weavers.

Artistic and cultural achievements 
Part of Puketapu-Hetet's work at Te Papa involved bridge-building between the Māori world and the European cultural institutions, leading to her featuring in a number of weaving-related works.

Among other places, a number of her art works are in Te Papa's collection, and the British Museum holds a pair of poi made by Puketapu-Hetet in 1995 and a kete muka (woven bag) made in 1994. The kete is made of flax fibre dyed black, woven in double-row twining, with two rows of pheasant feathers along the bottom; it is decorated with a taniko border in black, brown, yellow, and white, .

In common with other Māori artists, Puketapu-Hetet believed that art has a spiritual dimension and hidden meanings:

She wove using materials such as muka (prepared fibre of New Zealand flax), paua shell, stainless steel wire and feathers, including kiwi feathers.

Tu Tangata: Weaving for the People (2000), a documentary by Robin Greenberg, premiered at the New Zealand Film Festival before airing on television. In it Puketapu-Hetet and her family discuss "learning the disciplines of weaving and the importance of passing this gift on" to her descendants and the artists "of tomorrow." More provocatively, given weaving's cultural significance within traditional Māori culture and the connection between traditional art practices and Māori sociocultural identity, while presenting some of her more recent work Puketapu-Hetet discusses the need to adopt new practices, e.g., the use of new materials in light of the scarcity of traditional plants, such as harakeke/flax.

A survey exhibition of the work of Erenora Puketapu-Hetet and Rangi Hetet, Legacy: The Art of Rangi Hetet and Erenora Puketapu-Hetet, was staged at The Dowse Art Museum in 2016. Robin Greenberg's Mo te Iwi: Carving for the People (2019) follows preparations for this exhibition; along with its focus on Rangi Hetet's work, this film again shows how the art form is learned and shared within family and community as a whole. As Lillian Hetet, Erenora and Rangi's daughter says in Mo te Iwi, "Carving does not exist alone, just as a skill. It exists within a whole body of knowledge and that body of knowledge exists and is held by a whole community of people, by a whole nationhood of people."

Awards and recognitions
In 1990, Puketapu-Hetet was awarded the New Zealand 1990 Commemoration Medal. She was appointed an Officer of the New Zealand Order of Merit in the 2002 New Year Honours, for services to weaving. She was appointed to the board of the New Zealand Māori Arts and Crafts Institute in 2004. She was a member of the Queen Elizabeth Arts Council of New Zealand.

Publications
 Erenora Puketapu-Hetet, Maori weaving, Auckland: Pitman, 1989

References

External links
 Erenora Puketapu-Hetet (1941–2006) discusses her life as a weaver, video interview by the Museum of New Zealand Te Papa Tongarewa
 Weaver Erenora Puketapu-Hetet, Te Atiawa, text interview by the Museum of New Zealand Te Papa Tongarewa
 Map of artworks by Erenora Puketapu-Hetet and Rangi Hetet on public display

1941 births
2006 deaths
Te Āti Awa people
New Zealand Māori writers
People associated with the Museum of New Zealand Te Papa Tongarewa
New Zealand Māori weavers
Officers of the New Zealand Order of Merit
New Zealand women artists
20th-century New Zealand writers
New Zealand Māori women
Atkinson–Hursthouse–Richmond family
Women textile artists
20th-century New Zealand women writers